Sri Sai Mandir, also known as Sri Sai Baba Mandir is a Hindu temple in Belgaum, Karnataka, India. The temple, nestled in a residential area, is dedicated to the teachings of Sai Baba of Shirdi.

References

See also 
List of Hindu temples in India

Hindu temples in Belagavi district